The Travis Peak Formation is a geologic formation in Texas. It preserves fossils dating back to the Cretaceous period.

See also 
 List of fossiliferous stratigraphic units in Texas
 Paleontology in Texas

References

External links 
 

Cretaceous geology of Texas
Aptian Stage